Senathirajah Jeyanandamoorthy (born 16 September 1965) is a Sri Lankan Tamil politician and former Member of Parliament.

Early life and family
Jeyanandamoorthy was born on 16 September 1965.

Career
Jeyanandamoorthy had been a correspondent for Virakesari and TamilNet.

Jeyanandamoorthy was selected by the rebel Liberation Tigers of Tamil Eelam (LTTE) to be one of the Tamil National Alliance's (TNA) candidates in Batticaloa District at the 2004 parliamentary election. He was elected and entered Parliament.

Jeyanandamoorthy and his relatives were repeatedly threatened by the Tamil Makkal Viduthalai Pulikal, a Sri Lankan government backed paramilitary group. He subsequently fled to the United Kingdom.

In May 2010, he was elected to the Transnational Constituent Assembly of Tamil Eelam.

References

1965 births
British people of Sri Lankan Tamil descent
Living people
Members of the 13th Parliament of Sri Lanka
Members of the Transnational Constituent Assembly of Tamil Eelam
People from Eastern Province, Sri Lanka
Sri Lankan Hindus
Sri Lankan Tamil journalists
Sri Lankan Tamil politicians
Sri Lankan Tamil teachers
Tamil National Alliance politicians